Sodium nonanoyloxybenzenesulfonate (NOBS) is an important component of laundry detergents and bleaches.  It is known as a bleach activator for active oxygen sources, allowing formulas containing hydrogen peroxide releasing chemicals (specifically sodium perborate, sodium percarbonate, sodium perphosphate, sodium persulfate, and urea peroxide) to effect bleaching at lower temperatures.

Synthesis
NOBS is formed by the reaction of nonanoic acid (or its esters) with phenol followed by aromatic sulfonation using SO3 to form a sulfonic acid at the para-position.

Bleach activation
NOBS was developed by Procter & Gamble in 1983 and was first used in American laundry detergents in 1988. NOBS is the main bleach activator used in the U.S.A. and Japan. Compared to TAED, which is the predominant bleach activator used in Europe, NOBS is efficient at much lower temperatures. At 20 °C NOBS is 100 times more soluble than TAED in water. 
When attacked by the perhydroxyl anion (from hydrogen peroxide), NOBS forms the peroxy acid peroxynonanoic acid and releases the leaving group sodium 4-hydroxybenzene sulfonate, which is an inert by-product.

References

Cleaning product components
Benzenesulfonates
Anionic surfactants
Organic sodium salts
Nonanoate esters